The Pleasure Seekers is a 1964 American musical romantic comedy film directed by Jean Negulesco from a screenplay by Edith Sommer, based on the 1952 novel Coins in the Fountain by John H. Secondari. The film stars Ann-Margret, Tony Franciosa, Carol Lynley, Gardner McKay, and Pamela Tiffin, with Gene Tierney (in her final film) and Brian Keith. Ann-Margret sings four songs composed by Sammy Cahn and Jimmy Van Heusen.

The film was nominated for an Academy Award for Best Scoring of Music – Adaptation or Treatment for Lionel Newman and Alexander Courage.

Plot
Susie Higgins arrives in Madrid and moves in with her friend Maggie Williams and Maggie's roommate Fran Hobson. Still a virgin, Susie is surprised to find both of the other girls have active dating lives. Secretary Maggie has recently ended an affair and is now seeing her married boss Paul Barton, much to the dismay of Paul's jealous wife Jane. At the same time, Maggie's co-worker Pete McCoy is in love with Maggie, who barely notices him. Fran, an aspiring actress, flamenco dancer and singer, eagerly pursues Spanish doctor Andres Brioñes. While at the Museo del Prado, Susie catches the eye of wealthy playboy Emilio Lacayo, who adds her to his already large group of girlfriends.

The three girls spend the summer attending various parties while pursuing and being pursued by the men in their lives. In the end, Maggie chooses McCoy over Barton, Dr. Brioñes settles down with Fran, and Lacayo with Susie. All of them decide to stay in Madrid.

Cast

Production
The film was announced in February 1964. The original stars to be in it were Ann-Margret, Carol Lynley, James Darren and George Chakiris. By April, Darren and Chakiris had dropped out, replaced by Gardner MacKay, with Pamela Tiffin as the third girl. Negulsesco said the film would be different from the earlier one. "Instead of Rome, this picture is set in Madrid. Instead of three girls and three men, I'm using four. Naturally, the problems of American girls living in Madrid are similar to those in Three Coins, but this is 1964, so we'll have more difficulties."

Ann-Margret was paid $2,000 a week over ten weeks. This was less than she received for other studios, but she had an old commitment to Fox.

Filming started in May which stage Brian Keith had joined the cast. Several scenes were shot in the Prado Museum in Madrid.

Reception
According to Fox records, the film needed to earn $3,900,000 in film rentals to break even and made $3,205,000, meaning it lost money.

Filmink argued "The film is fun but hampered by the fact Ann-Margret’s the only lead actor who can sing and dance, and it’s, well, a musical."

References

External links
 
 
 
 

1964 films
1964 musical comedy films
1964 romantic comedy films
1960s English-language films
1960s romantic musical films
20th Century Fox films
American musical comedy films
American romantic comedy films
American romantic musical films
CinemaScope films
Films based on American novels
Films directed by Jean Negulesco
Films scored by Lionel Newman
Films set in Madrid
Films shot in Madrid
1960s American films